Jarapa is a thick fabric of various compositions, used to make traditional rugs, blankets, bedspreads, curtains etc. in Almería and Murcia in the Spanish South East. 

Manufacture and use are concentrated in the area of the Alpujarras. The material used in their manufacture is often recycled scraps from the textile industry of Catalonia further North.

Woven fabrics